Ihre Hoheit die Tänzerin can refer to the following:

 Ihre Hoheit, die Tänzerin (operetta), an operetta by Walter Goetze
 Ihre Hoheit die Tänzerin (film), a 1922 German film featuring Béla Lugosi